St Augustine's Cathedral, Maciene is an Anglican church in  the Diocese of Lebombo, Mozambique. The current incumbent is The  Rev Rev. Judas Chano Moda.

References 

Anglican cathedrals in Africa
Cathedrals in Mozambique